Cate Parish is an American poet.

Life
Her work has appeared in Stand, Orbis, 
Other Poetry,
PN Review 
The Rialto 
The North 
The London Magazine 
Poetry London' Gairfish The Observer The Times Literary Supplement The Boston Phoenix Poetry Review, and in The Independent.

Parish lives in Kent, England and 
works as a teacher.

Awards
 1997 Tabla Poetry Competition 
 1999 Keats-Shelley Prize for Poetry
 1998 Stand Magazine 2nd International Poetry Competition

Works
"Everything is Possible", The Oscars Press Website Anthology
"Without Them", Thumbscrew, No 16 - Summer 2000

Anthologies

 'Riding Pillion' Poetry Business Anthology 1994  
 Virago New Poets, Melanie Silgardo, Janet Beck Eds, Virago, 1993, New Writing 4'', A. S. Byatt and Alan Hollinghurst Ed, Vintage, 1995
 'How Words See' 1998 Occasional Works, Menlo Park, CA 94026 USA

References

Living people
American women poets
21st-century American poets
21st-century American women writers
Year of birth missing (living people)